Graham Kell Tudor (born 30 October 1920 – 3 April 1999) is a former Australian rules footballer who played with Carlton in the Victorian Football League (VFL).

Notes

External links 

Graham Tudor's profile at Blueseum

1920 births
1999 deaths
Carlton Football Club players
Cananore Football Club players
Australian rules footballers from Tasmania